Peter Goodfellow may refer to:
 Peter Goodfellow (geneticist) (born 1951), British geneticist
 Peter Goodfellow (politician), New Zealand businessman and politician
 Peter Goodfellow (artist) (born 1950), British artist